Agylla argentea is a moth of the family Erebidae. It was described by Francis Walker in 1863. It is found in the Brazilian states of São Paulo and Rio de Janeiro.

References

Moths described in 1863
argentea
Moths of South America